Cha Cha is a 1979 Dutch film written by Herman Brood and directed by Herbert Curiel. It stars Herman Brood, Nina Hagen, Lene Lovich and Les Chappell. Released on December 13, 1979, the film is a story of a bank robber who is trying to change his life and become a rock star. It takes place in Amsterdam's punk and new wave scene. All characters in the film have the same names as the actors. Cha Cha features musical performances by the main actors. The soundtrack for the film was released by CBS and Ariola Records. The picture has since then become a cult film.

Sources

External links 

1979 films
Dutch drama films
1970s Dutch-language films
1970s English-language films
1970s German-language films
Dutch rock music films
Films set in Amsterdam
Films shot in Amsterdam
Punk films
Herman Brood
1979 multilingual films
Dutch multilingual films